Italian Graffiti is a 1973 Italian criminal comedy film written and directed by Alfio Caltabiano and starring Pino Colizzi and Ornella Muti.

Plot
Assunta Morano is the daughter of Bug Morano, a Sicilian boss transplanted in Chicago in 1929 where there is prohibition on alcohol sales.

The father took part in the fighting between criminal gangs for control of the alcohol market and casinos, but his men are little capable, starting from his brother Wolf Morano. The goal of Morano is to eliminate the rival gang of so-called "Irish", led by "Reverend". Daughter Santuzza instead of peaceful soul, though passionate, and does not participate of family plans.

Forward to Marano bosses are awaiting the arrival from a "mammasantissima" Sicily with the task of strengthening the team of killers against "Irish". These arrives, but is neither fierce nor ruthless; is called Salvatore Mandolea and is a handsome and polite, has a lot of irony and skill with machine gun and shotgun, but it is a good, and especially womanizer. Struck by the beauty of Santuzza, falls in love.

The personal mission of the young man becomes secretly conquer Santuzza; he succeeds and escapes with the intention to get her pregnant; she also loves him then perform a classic fuitina and marry. Back between the two bands will lead a battle to pacify and unite the feuding families, giving birth to a single large band of Sicilian mobsters, mafia less and less incapable, having now heads the mammasantissima Santuzza.

Cast 

 Pino Colizzi as  Salvatore Mandolea
 Ornella Muti as  Santuzza Morano
 Alfio Caltabiano as The Reverend  
 Luciano Catenacci as  Bug Morano 
 Tano Cimarosa as   Lupo Morano
 Christa Linder as  Dolly
 Brendan Cauldwell as The Chemist
 Furio Meniconi as Lollo Daddarita 
 Rina Franchetti as Morano's Mom
 Sean Kavanagh as stunt driver

See also
 List of Italian films of 1973

References

External links

1973 films
Italian crime comedy films
1970s crime comedy films
Titanus films
Films scored by Guido & Maurizio De Angelis
Mafia comedy films
Films set in the 1920s
Films set in the United States
1970s Italian-language films
1970s American films
1970s Italian films